This is a list of the highest points of the Canadian provinces and territories, by height.

Notes
Fairweather Mountain is the officially gazetted name, but Mount Fairweather is the common usage. Mount Fairweather is on the boundary with Alaska, with only the summit and about 1/3 of the peak's massif within British Columbia. The highest summit completely within British Columbia is Mount Waddington in the Pacific Ranges of the Coast Mountains.
Because it is on the Continental Divide of the Americas, Mount Columbia is in British Columbia as well as Alberta.
Nirvana is the unofficial name of this mountain and shows on alpine literature as such,  the Canadian Government still refers to it as "unnamed peak".
This peak, which lies on the border between the two provinces, is known as Mount Caubvick in Newfoundland and Labrador and Mont D'Iberville in Quebec.
The main peak of Maple Mountain has a higher vertical rise over the surrounding landscape,  higher than the Ishpatina Ridge rising over Scarecrow Lake.

Lowest points
Since there is no land area of Canada that is below sea level, the lowest elevation of Canada is at any point along its maritime coast, and all provinces and territories except Alberta and Saskatchewan have a maritime coast. The shore of Lake Athabasca, which straddles Alberta and Saskatchewan, is Saskatchewan's lowest dry point ( above sea level). The Slave River (which drains Lake Athabasca) flows from northeastern Alberta into the Northwest Territories and is Alberta's lowest point at the N.W.T. border ( above sea level). Parts of Richmond, British Columbia are below sea-level, though behind dikes.

References

Highest points
Canada
Canadian provinces and territories
Highest points
Highest point
Lists of mountains of Canada